Santa Cruz Higher Secondary School was established in 1888. It currently has higher secondary level status. It is one of the oldest schools in Kerala. The school is located near the Fort Kochi Beach and Santa Cruz basilica. This school is under Roman Catholic Diocese of Cochin.

External links 
Footage of the school building's exterior

References

1888 establishments in India
Educational institutions established in 1888
Catholic secondary schools in India
Christian schools in Kerala
High schools and secondary schools in Kochi